Vinod Vaikuntanathan is a professor of computer science at the Massachusetts Institute of Technology and a principal investigator at the  MIT Computer Science and Artificial Intelligence Laboratory. His work is focused on cryptography, including homomorphic encryption. He is the co-recipient of the 2022 Gödel Prize, together with Zvika Brakerski and Craig Gentry.

Education 
Vaikuntanathan received his bachelor's degree in computer science from the Indian Institute of Technology Madras in 2003 and his Ph.D in computer science in 2009 from Massachusetts Institute of Technology under the supervision of Shafi Goldwasser. From 2008 to 2010, he was a Josef Raviv postdoctoral fellow at the IBM T.J. Watson Research Center, and from 2010 to 2011, a researcher at Microsoft Research. From Fall 2011 to Spring 2013, he was a professor at the University of Toronto. In Fall 2013, he joined the faculty at MIT.

References

Living people
Year of birth missing (living people)
Gödel Prize laureates
Massachusetts Institute of Technology faculty